Shooting Fish is a 1997 British romantic crime comedy film directed by Stefan Schwartz and co-written with Richard Holmes. Starring Dan Futterman and Stuart Townsend as two con men with Kate Beckinsale as their unwilling assistant, the film was produced by Winchester Films and partly funded by National Lottery money administered through the UK Arts Council. Shooting Fish aimed to transfer well to international markets that were keen on British films following the success of Four Weddings and a Funeral.

The film was released in the United Kingdom on 17 October 1997 and in the United States on 1 May 1998.

Plot
Dylan (Dan Futterman) and Jez (Stuart Townsend) are two orphans who meet in their twenties and vow to achieve their shared childhood dream of living in a stately home. In pursuit of this dream, they spend their days living in a disused gas holder, spending as little money as possible and conning the upper classes out of their riches. During one of their cons, they encounter Georgie (Kate Beckinsale) who is a medical student who can type.

Georgie becomes aware that the two are con-artists. But they manage to convince her that they are modern day Robin Hoods, taking from the rich and giving to the poor. When a con goes wrong, the two find themselves jailed. They later learn that their entire fortune is to be rendered useless as the Royal Bank of England is recalling the notes. Jez and Dylan decide they need to somehow escape and retrieve their money or risk losing it. Jez contacts Georgie and appeals to her to help.

Georgie, unbeknownst to the guys, needs money to save the Down syndrome foundation's mansion that her brother currently attends. She organises for Jez and Dylan to get released on compassionate leave under the guise of attending the cremation of a relative. While the ceremony is ongoing, they sneak out and retrieve the money and return before the prison warders suspect a thing. With the money hidden in the coffin they accidentally send it to be cremated and are returned to prison completely despondent.

It turns out to be a double con as Georgie retrieves the money and buys her ex's "champion" horse only to learn that the horse is a dud. When the guys get out she comes clean and they hatch another plan which will see the horse win a big race allowing them to charge stud fees. Everything works out and the horse romps to victory (thanks to inserting helium in the jockeys outfit).

Georgie agrees to sell the now champion horse back to her ex. With the proceeds all three agree to save the foundation and as they drive to the foundation broke, Jez and Dylan realise they have finally found their stately home.

Cast

 Dan Futterman as Dylan
 Jacob Macoby as 8-year-old Dylan
 Stuart Townsend as Jez
 Myles Anderson as 8-year-old Jez
 Kate Beckinsale as Georgie
 Dominic Mafham as Roger
 Tom Chadbon as Mr. Greenaway
 Phyllis Logan as Mrs. Ross
 Peter Capaldi as Mr. Gilzean
 Geoffrey Whitehead as Horse owner
 Ralph Ineson as Mr. Ray
 Nicola Duffett as Mrs. Ray
 Annette Crosbie as Mrs. Cummins
 Nicholas Woodeson as Mr. Collyns
 Jane Lapotaire as Dylan's headmistress
 Rowena Cooper as Jez's teacher
 John Clegg as Vicar

Production
The film was shot in the autumn of 1996 (August–October). Most filming took place at Shepperton Studios and outside street locations in north London. Alexandra Palace features in one notable scene. The gas holder in which Dylan and Jez live no longer exists, having been situated in Mill Hill East up to the early 2000s. The crematorium scene was filmed in Garston, west Hertfordshire. The film would eventually make its nationwide screening in October 1997.

Reception
The film held its own commercially in the UK. Reviews at the time singled out Townsend for praise but felt the narrative contained one twist and turn too many. Others suggested the film was merely an 'Ealing Comedy' in modern form and lacked modern characterization. The 'soft comedic focus' however had been a deliberate plan by the production team who wanted to avoid the socio-political realism in comedies like Brassed Off and The Full Monty.

A Time Out review (1997) said, "A succession of cameos provides light relief, and the film's saved by the amiable performances of Futterman, Beckinsale and, especially, Townsend."

Accolades
Beckinsale was awarded Best Actress for her performance in Shooting Fish at the Sitges - Catalan International Film Festival.

Soundtrack
Stefan Schwartz, the director, was looking for an essential nineties feel to the film. The era of Britpop was at its height and this was reflected in a stylish and striking array of tracks for a light comedy film:
 "Me and You vs the World" Written & Performed by Space Courtesy of Hit & Run Music/Gut Music & Gut Records
 "I'm a Little Teapot" Written by George Sanders & Clarence Kelly
 "Beautiful Alone" Written & Performed by Strangelove
 "Neighbourhood" Written & Performed by Space
 "Day Before Yesterday's Man" Written by James McColl Performed by The Supernaturals
 "Golden Skin" Written & Performed by Silver Sun
 "I'm a Better Man (For Having Loved You)" Words & Music by Hal David and Burt Bacharach Specially Recorded by David McAlmont
 "What the World Needs Now Is Love" Words & Music by Hal David & Burt Bacharach Performed by Jackie DeShannon
 "Friends" Written & Performed by The Wannadies
 "Body Medusa (The Leftfield Re-mix)" Written & Performed by Supereal Additional Production by Leftfield
 "Bluetonic" Written by The Bluetones and Adrian Mitchell Performed by The Bluetones
 "Twist" Performed by Symposium
 "In Charge" Specially Written & Produced by Stephen Hillier and Chris Wilkie Performed by Dubstar
 "Do You Know the Way to San Jose?" Words & Music by Hal David and Burt Bacharach Performed by Dionne Warwick
 "In Pursuit of Happiness" Written by Neil Hannon Performed by The Divine Comedy
 "To Be the One" Written & Performed by Passion Star
 "Falling in Love" Written by Henrey Anadon & Jo Burrise
 "Tribute to BB" Specially Written & Produced by Layo Paskin & Matthew B

Home media
The original 112-minute version of Shooting Fish was released on VHS in the UK in 1998, running to 107 minutes due to PAL speed-up. When released on DVD (and re-released on VHS) in 2001, however, it ran to 99 minutes, equivalent to 103 minutes theatrically. This is apparently the US cinema version, having removed some scenes and dialogue aimed more specifically at British audiences (such as some references to Margaret Thatcher). As of September 2014 it has not been re-released uncut, or in the Blu-ray format.

References

External links
 
 
 
 

1997 films
1990s crime comedy films
1997 romantic comedy films
British crime comedy films
British romantic comedy films
Dyslexia in fiction
Films directed by Stefan Schwartz
Films shot at Shepperton Studios
Fox Searchlight Pictures films
Romantic crime films
1990s English-language films
1990s British films